New Trade Union Initiative is a trade union centre in India founded in 2002. NTUI proclaims itself as independent from political parties. Its core constituent is the National Centre for Labour, a trade union of informal sector workers. The founding conference of NTUI was held in 2006. Y.V. Chavan was elected president of NTUI, Ashim Roy the general secretary. At the time of the 2006 conference, NTUI had around 300 affiliated unions.

External links
Article on the founding of NTUI

References

Trade unions in India
National trade union centres of India
Trade unions established in 2002